2012 EG5 is an Apollo near-Earth asteroid with an estimated diameter of . The asteroid was discovered on March 13, 2012. The asteroid came within  of Earth during its closest approach on April 1, 2012, just over half the distance between Earth and the moon's orbit. It was briefly listed on the Sentry Risk Table with a 1 in 2,778,000 chance of an impact in 2107. It was removed from the Sentry Risk Table on 1 April 2012.

References

External links 
 
 
 

Minor planet object articles (unnumbered)

20120401
20120313